Gare de Château-du-Loir is a railway station serving the town Château-du-Loir, Sarthe department, western France.

Services

The station is served by regional trains to Le Mans and Tours.

References

Railway stations in Pays de la Loire
TER Pays de la Loire
Railway stations in France opened in 1858